Jalili Fadili (born 1941) is a Moroccan football defender who played for Morocco in the 1970 FIFA World Cup. He also played for 
SCC Mohammédia and FAR Rabat.

References

1941 births
Moroccan footballers
Morocco international footballers
Association football defenders
SCC Mohammédia players
AS FAR (football) players
Botola players
1970 FIFA World Cup players
Competitors at the 1967 Mediterranean Games
Living people
People from Mohammedia
Mediterranean Games competitors for Morocco